PowWow was the first Internet instant message and chat programs for Windows. It was made by a company called Tribal Voice, Inc.

Features
Many of the features found in contemporary instant messaging programs were first introduced in PowWow. The program also had several innovative features such as allowing users to talk with each other using VoIP, a shared whiteboard, a built-in speech synthesizer, WAV sound file playing, offline transmittal of instant messages via POP/SMTP, and the ability for users to share their web surfing experience concurrently by redirecting either party to a new URL when another navigates elsewhere. It also had built-in file transfer with a simple drag-and-drop interface to make file sharing very easy.

History

The company was founded in Woodland Park, Colorado, United States, at the end of 1994, by the software millionaire John McAfee, founder of McAfee Associates (later called McAfee or Intel Security Group). At first, the company described itself, especially on its web site, as a 'Native American' company run by Native Americans. As the company grew, the Native American references gradually disappeared.

The company eventually located its corporate headquarters in Scotts Valley, California.

In the late 1990s, Tribal Voice began to OEM the PowWow software in order to increase market share.  While most of these deals were insubstantial, several were with high-profile companies, including AT&T's WorldNet Internet service provider (ISP), search engine/portal AltaVista, and Freeserve, a United Kingdom-based ISP.

PowWow was one of the first instant messaging programs to provide interoperability between multiple instant messaging clients, being compatible with both AOL Instant Messenger (AIM) and Microsoft's MSN Messenger.

In the late 1990s AOL sued Tribal Voice for use of the phrase 'buddy list' and made repeated efforts to block interoperability between their instant messaging client and Tribal Voice's, as well as those of other companies.

In 1998, original founder McAfee brought in Joseph Esposito, formerly the president and CEO of Encyclopædia Britannica, to run the company.

In 1999, the company was acquired by dot-com incubator CMGI, who moved the company's development center from Woodland Park to Colorado Springs, Colorado, and closed the Scotts Valley office.  In 2000, CMGI merged the company into CMGIon, a division of CMGI, founded with help from Sun Microsystems and Novell.  In January 2001, CMGIon closed its Colorado Springs office, the former Tribal Voice.

Bibliography
 Article about Tribal Voice's first step to generate revenue
 
 
 AT&T WorldNet selects PowWow for IM client
 AltaVista selects PowWow for IM client
 
 
 Experimental PowWow server set up by former employees
 VICE That Time John McAfee Developed One of the First Social Networks

References

Windows instant messaging clients
Computer-related introductions in 1994
Products and services discontinued in 2001
Internet properties established in 1994
Internet properties disestablished in 2001
Defunct instant messaging clients